Sinowatsonia is a genus of moths in the family Erebidae from mountains of West China.

Species 
 Sinowatsonia hoenei (Daniel, 1943)
 Sinowatsonia hoenei alpicola (Daniel, 1943)
 Sinowatsonia mussoti (Oberthür, 1903)

References
Natural History Museum Lepidoptera generic names catalog

Spilosomina
Moth genera